Solo is an album by guitarist Jimmy Raney which was recorded in 1976 and released on the Xanadu label.

Reception

The Allmusic review awarded the album 4 stars stating "This intriguing set features Jimmy Raney in a set of overdubbed guitar duets with himself. He put a lot of thought into the interpretations".

Track listing 
All compositions by Jimmy Raney except where noted.
 "The Fugue" – 6:56  
 "New Signal" – 6:39  
 "How Deep is the Ocean?" (Irving Berlin) – 6:50  
 "The Way You Look Tonight" (Dorothy Fields, Jerome Kern) – 4:27  
 "Wait till You See Her" (Richard Rodgers, Lorenz Hart) – 5:54  
 "Smoke Gets in Your Eyes" (Kern, Otto Harbach) – 5:57  
 "Blues Variations" – 6:29

Personnel 
Jimmy Raney – guitar

References 

Jimmy Raney albums
1978 albums
Xanadu Records albums
Albums produced by Don Schlitten